Eucalyptus infracorticata is a species of mallee that is endemic to a small area of Western Australia. It has rough, flaky or fibrous bark on the lower part of the trunk, broad lance-shaped adult leaves, flower buds in groups of between seven and eleven and short cylindrical fruit.

Description
Eucalyptus infracorticata is a mallee. It has rough fibrous or flaky, pale grey bark on the base of the trunk.

Taxonomy and naming
Eucalyptus infracorticata was first formally described in 2001 by Lawrie Johnson and Ken Hill from a specimen collected near Queen Victoria Spring near Cundeelee and the description was published in the journal Telopea. The specific epithet (infracortica) is from the Latin infra meaning "below" and corticatus meaning "covered with bark", referring to the rough bark on the base of the trunk.

The species is regarded as a synonym of Eucalyptus gypsophila by Dean Nicolle and is not listed at FloraBase.

Distribution and habitat
This eucalypt grows in open mallee shrubland in sandy loam and is only known from the type location.

See also
List of Eucalyptus species

References

infracorticata
Eucalypts of Western Australia
Myrtales of Australia
Plants described in 2001
Taxa named by Lawrence Alexander Sidney Johnson
Taxa named by Ken Hill (botanist)